"The Pieces Don't Fit Anymore" is a song by British singer James Morrison, from his debut album Undiscovered. It was released on 18 December 2006 as his third single.

The song is a break up/letting go song, with Morrison commentating that the song is an ode to a point in a relationship where "no matter what [you] try, it just does not seem to work out anymore".

The song appeared in the second episode of the fourth season of The O.C..

Track listing
 "The Pieces Don't Fit Anymore"
 "Don't Close Your Eyes"

Charts

References

Pieces Don't Fit Anymore, The
Pieces Don't Fit Anymore, The
Songs written by Steve Robson
Songs written by Martin Brammer
Songs written by James Morrison (singer)
Song recordings produced by Steve Robson
Chamber pop songs
Rock ballads
2006 songs
Polydor Records singles
Songs about heartache
Torch songs